The Southern Mazghuna Pyramid is an ancient Egyptian royal tomb which was built during the 12th or the 13th Dynasty in Mazghuna, 5 km south of Dahshur, Egypt. The building was never finished, and is still unknown which pharaoh was the owner, since no appropriate inscription have been found.
The pyramid was rediscovered in 1910 by Ernest Mackay and excavated in the following year by Flinders Petrie.

Attribution

The building shares some structural similarities to the Hawara pyramid of Amenemhat III, and for this reason it is usually attributed to his son Amenemhat IV (around the end of the 19th-century BCE). In parallel, the near northern Mazghuna pyramid is considered to be the tomb of his sister Sobekneferu, the last ruler of the 12th Dynasty.
However, some researchers such as William C. Hayes believed that the southern pyramid was built during the 13th Dynasty, on the basis of some similarities with the pyramid of Khendjer. In this case, it should have belonged to one of the many pharaohs who ruled between the beginning of the 13th Dynasty and the loss of control of the northern territory occurred during or soon after the reign of Merneferre Ay.

Description
The core masonry consists of mudbricks and only reaches a height of one to two layers. Casing stones were not found; therefore, it is impossible to determine information about the planned inclination angle and total height.

The entrance of the pyramid is located in the middle of the south side. A staircase leads down to a short horizontal passage. Here is a wall niche, from where a blocking stone had been pushed into the passage. Another staircase leads to a second block, which, however, is still in its niche.
Finally a U-shaped chamber system leads to the burial chamber, which is topped by a gable roof. There was an empty – but used – quartzite sarcophagus and some few grave goods (three limestone lamps, an alabaster duck-shaped vessel, a make-up vessel made from the same material and a piece of polished soapstone) were found in it.

The complex is surrounded by a wavy wall, which incorporate the remains of the chapel in the middle of the east side; it consists of a large central chamber with two chambers on each side of the storehouse. The central chamber was attached in its southwestern corner with a sacrificial hall with a vaulted roof.

See also 
 List of Egyptian pyramids

References

Sources
 Mark Lehner, Das Geheimnis der Pyramiden in Ägypten. Orbis Verlag, München 1999, pp. 184–185, .
 Rainer Stadelmann, Die ägyptischen Pyramiden. Vom Ziegelbau zum Weltwunder. Verlag Philipp von Zabern, 3. Aufl., Mainz 1997, pp. 250–251, 
 Miroslav Verner, Die Pyramiden. Rowohlt Verlag, Reinbek 1998, pp. 472–474, .

External links

 The Mazghuna Pyramids

18th century BC in Egypt
Pyramids of the Twelfth Dynasty of Egypt
Pyramids of the Thirteenth Dynasty of Egypt
Buildings and structures completed in the 18th century BC
2nd-millennium BC establishments in Egypt
1910 archaeological discoveries